Putina is a town in southern Peru, capital of the province San Antonio de Putina in the region Puno.

In Quechua, the word "Putina" means boiling water.

It was founded on May 24, 1595.

References

Populated places in the Puno Region